Vice Admiral Count Gösta Carl Albert Ehrensvärd (10 February 1885 – 2 November 1973) was a Swedish Navy officer.

Early life
Ehrensvärd was born on 10 February 1885 in Skabersjö, Svedala Municipality, Sweden, the son of Admiral, Count Carl August Ehrensvärd (1858–1944) and his wife baroness Lovisa Ulrika "Ulla" (née Thott). He was the brother of Chief of the Army, General Carl August Ehrensvärd (1892–1974) and Deputy Director of the Ministry of Defence Augustin Ehrensvärd (1887–1968). His great-grandfather was the fortress builder Augustin Ehrensvärd, his uncle was Albert Ehrensvärd and his cousin was Archibald Douglas.

Career
He became a sea cadet in 1898 and was commissioned into the Swedish Navy as an acting sub lieutenant in 1904 after passing the naval officer examination. Ehrensvärd was promoted to sub-lieutenant in 1906. Ehrensvärd passed the higher course at the Royal Swedish Naval Staff College from 1910 to 1911 and was promoted to lieutenant in 1913. He was a teacher at the Royal Swedish Naval Academy from 1916 to 1919 and at the Royal Swedish Naval Staff College from 1918 to 1922 when he was promoted to commander. Seagoing services in the 1910s was partly as captain and division commander of torpedo boats.

Ehrensvärd was commanding officer of the Destroyer Division in 1919 and from 1923 to 1924. He was Chief of the Naval Staff from 1937 to 1939 and was promoted to rear admiral in 1938. Ehrensvärd was Chief of the Coastal Fleet from 1939 to 1942 and commanding admiral of the South Coast Navy District from 1942 to 1950 when he was promoted to vice admiral.

Other work
Ehrensvärd was editor of the journal Tidskrift i sjöväsendet from 1925 to 1927 and a member of the 1930 Defense Commission from 1930 to 1932.

Personal life
On 5 January 1909 he married Anna Enell (born (1886–1972), the daughter of pharmacist Henrik Enell and Emma (née Öst). He was the father of Gösta (1910–1980), Carl August (1913–1982) and Ulla (1918–1983). Ehrensvärd died on 2 November 1973 in Hässleholm and was buried at Tosterup cemetery in Tomelilla Municipality.

Dates of rank
1904 – Acting sub-lieutenant
1906 – Sub-lieutenant
1913 – Lieutenant
1922 – Commander
1933 – Captain
1938 – Rear admiral
1950 – Vice admiral

Awards and decorations

Ehrensvärd's awards:

Swedish
  King Gustaf V's Jubilee Commemorative Medal (1948)
   Commander Grand Cross of the Order of the Sword (6 June 1946)
  Knight of the Order of the Polar Star
  Knight of the Order of Vasa
  Swedish Auxiliary Naval Corps' gold medal (Sjövärnskårens guldmedalj)

Foreign
   Grand Cross of the Order of St. Olav (1 July 1956)
  Commander of the Order of St. Olav with star
  Commander First Class of the Order of the Dannebrog
  Commander First Class of the Crosses of Naval Merit
  Commander of the Order of the White Rose of Finland
  Commander of the Order of Polonia Restituta
  Knight of the Order of the Crown of Italy
  Knight Third Class of the Order of Saint Stanislaus
  Fourth Class of the Order of the Medjidie
  Danish Medal of Liberation

Honours
Member of the Royal Swedish Academy of War Sciences (1933)
Member of the Royal Swedish Society of Naval Sciences (1920; honorary member in 1938)

References

1885 births
1973 deaths
Swedish counts
Swedish Navy vice admirals
People from Svedala Municipality
Members of the Royal Swedish Academy of War Sciences
Members of the Royal Swedish Society of Naval Sciences
Commanders Grand Cross of the Order of the Sword
Knights of the Order of the Polar Star
Knights of the Order of Vasa